The 1999 Sta.Lucia Realtors season was the seventh season of the franchise in the Philippine Basketball Association (PBA).

Draft pick

Occurrences
Assistant coach Adonis Tierra signed a two-year deal to be promoted back as coach of the Realtors, replacing Derrick Pumaren, who moved over to Purefoods. 

In the Commissioner's Cup, the Realtors had Kwan Johnson as their import and along with the signing of their direct-hire recruit, Fil-Am Rob Parker, their tandem nearly led Sta.Lucia to their first finals appearance in the Commissioner's Cup when they lead the best-of-five semifinal series against Formula Shell, two games to one, only to lose the last two matches.  

Prior to the start of the Governor's Cup, a senate hearing was conducted on the ongoing investigation regarding the fake Fil-foreigners playing in the league, the flamboyant Rob Parker with the possibility of being deported, breached his contract and suddenly left the team unnoticed. The Realtors retain Kwan Johnson but soon replaced him with Joseph Temple, who was one of their imports from last season.

Notable dates
March 26: Dennis Espino delivered the clutch baskets in the stretch as the Realtors scored an 82-73 victory over Barangay Ginebra Kings in their first assignment in the second round of eliminations of the All-Filipino Cup. Sta.Lucia survived a third quarter run by the Gin Kings and took its third win in nine outings.  

July 11: The Realtors dealt Mobiline its worst loss with a 103-74 victory to finally barge into the win column and spoiled Jerry Codiñera's debut with the Phone Pals as Fil-Am Robert Parker displayed a fiery, grandstanding offensive while Kwan Johnson registered his first triple-double of 22 points, 11 rebounds and 10 assists in the Commissioner's Cup tournament. 

July 18: Sta.Lucia scored its second victory in five outings with an 88-78 win over Baranagay Ginebra Kings.

Roster

Team Manager: Manuel Encarnado

Transactions

Direct hire

Additions

Recruited imports

References

Sta. Lucia
Sta. Lucia Realtors seasons